Aulax pallasia, the needle-leaf featherbush, is a species of shrub in the genus Aulax. It is native to the Western Cape, South Africa.

Description
There are few twigs on the trunk. The plant sprouts again after a fire. The plant is bisexual and male and female flowers grow on different plants. The plants bloom from January to April. It is pollinated by a variety of insect species. Female flowers dry out and form a woody shell in which the seeds are formed and preserved. The seeds are spread by the wind.

Distribution and habitat
The plant is widespread. It occurs from Piketberg and Koue Bokkeveldberg to Hottentots Hollandberg and Groenlandberg to the middle of the Langeberg and the Riviersonderendberg.

References

External links

Proteaceae